O'Connell's GAC, Tullysaran is a Gaelic Athletic Association club in County Armagh, Northern Ireland. It is part of Armagh GAA, and is based in the rural district of Tullysaran.

The club's senior teams currently play Gaelic football in the Armagh Intermediate Championship and Division 2 of the All-County Leagues. It has several under-age football teams, and provides for Ladies' Gaelic football and camogie.

History
Tullysaran O'Connell's was one of the nine clubs represented at the first recorded meeting of Armagh County Board on 30 March 1889. The Armagh Guardian of 20 May 1904 records a match being played at Kilmatroy near Tullysaran, but the club's own records date back only to 1932, referring not to the present name but to Knappagh O'Connell's or the Sons of O'Connor, Knappagh. In the late 1930s the parish league included a White Arrows team from Maydown, and other teams from Milltown/Aughatarra, Ballymacully and Knappagh.

The O'Connell's name re-emerged around 1947.

Gaelic football

Honours
 Armagh Intermediate Football League B 2019
 Armagh Intermediate Football Championship
 Runner-Up 2016
Armagh Junior Football Championship 
 2015 Runner-up 1957, 2010
 Armagh Junior Football League
 1957
Trodden Cup
 1957

Facilities
In the 1930s the games were played at Trainor's field at Knappagh crossroads. In 1970 the field behind the chapel was rented from the parish and Fr Clarke donated an asbestos bungalow as changing rooms. Major Terris donated goalposts and the club was going strong once more. In 1971 the clubrooms were destroyed in an explosion. New club rooms were later erected and remained until the 1990s.

References

External links 
 Tullysaran O'Connell's GAC website
 Tullysaran page on Armagh GAA website

Gaelic games clubs in County Armagh
Gaelic football clubs in County Armagh